Dalma Garden Mall is an Armenian enclosed shopping mall. It is located near the Tsitsernakaberd hill in the Armenian capital Yerevan. It is the first mall in Armenia.

History
The project was announced in 2009 and the mall opened in October 2012. The mall was built by the "Tashir Group" led by Armenian-born Russian businessman Samvel Karapetyan. President Serzh Sargsyan attended the opening ceremony.

The mall also has a hypermarket/supermarket of the Armenian chain "Yerevan city".

Services
On November 18, 2013, the "Cinema Star" multiplex cinema theatre opened in the mall. "Cinema Star" is a Russian cinema chain that entered the Armenian market through its 6 halls in the Dalma Garden Mall. The multiplex is near Michael's café-restaurant.

References

Shopping malls in Armenia
Tourist attractions in Yerevan
Buildings and structures in Yerevan
Shopping malls established in 2012
2012 establishments in Armenia